Jan (born 16 May 1995), better known as Pokémon Challenges, is a German Twitch streamer and YouTuber, known for his live streams broadcasting Pokémon content, most notably Nuzlocke Challenges.

Career 
Jan is known for completing so-called "hardcore" Nuzlocke Challenges on Twitch, which are self-imposed challenges of Pokémon games aimed at increasing the difficulty of the game. These "harcore" Nuzlocke challenges weaken or eliminate some of the rules of a Nuzlocke while introducing other restrictions compared to the traditional ruleset; for instance, while the "hardcore" rules allow for risk-free leveling up through glitched items and break the rule that only the first Pokémon encountered in each new area may be caught, the rules do force the player to not level up beyond the level of the next major battle and to never use items in battle. In 2016, Jan completed a permadeath solo run of Pokémon FireRed using Rattata, one of the game's weakest characters.

Jan's YouTube and Twitch channels significantly gained traction in 2020, following a reaction video to a Nuzlocke attempt by Jaiden Animations. During the same period, Jan was attempting the Nuzlocke challenge of Pokémon Emerald Kaizo, a ROM hack of Pokémon Emerald, which he beat in 2021. He eventually completed the challenge on his 151st attempt; coincidentally, 151 is the exact number of generation I Pokémon.

References 

1995 births
Living people
German YouTubers
Gaming YouTubers
Let's Players
Twitch (service) streamers
Video game commentators
Pokémon video game players